A gonidium (plural gonidia) is an asexual reproductive cell or group of cells, especially in algae.

References 

Algal anatomy